Chaya Mushka Schneersohn was the daughter of Rabbi Dovber Schneuri, the second Rebbe of the Chabad Hasidic movement, and the wife of Rabbi Menachem Mendel Schneersohn the third Rebbe.

Chaya Mushka Schneerson was also a seventh generation descendant of the Hassidic Rebbe, Rabbi Levi Yitzchak of Berditchev.

Chaya Mushka Schneerson died on December 9, 1860 O.S. (Tevet 8, 5621; December 21, 1860 N.S.), and was buried in the town of Lubavitch near her grandmother Rebbetzin Sterna and her mother Rebbetzin Sheina.

History
Chaya Mushka Schneersohn married the third Rebbe of Chabad, Rabbi Menachem Mendel Schneersohn. She is known in the Chabad community as "Rebbetzin Chaya Mushka." Rebbetzin Chaya Mushka was an advocate for Agunot, women who are bound to their marriages by Jewish law whether through the husband's disappearance or refusal to comply with divorce proceedings.

Chaya Mushka held the personal custom of reciting the Slichot prayers during the week between Rosh Hashana, the Jewish New Year, and Yom Kippur, the Day of Atonement.

References

Chabad-Lubavitch (Hasidic dynasty)
Schneersohn family
1860 deaths
Rebbetzins of Lubavitch